Strongyliceps is a genus of East African sheet weavers that was first described by L. Fage & Eugène Louis Simon in 1936.  it contains only two species, both found in Uganda and Kenya: S. alluaudi and S. anderseni.

See also
 List of Linyphiidae species (Q–Z)

References

Araneomorphae genera
Linyphiidae
Spiders of Africa